Rodriguinho is a diminutive form of the given name Rodrigo, and refers to:

Rodriguinho (footballer, born 1980), full name Rodrigo Antônio Lopes Belchior, Brazilian football forward
Rodriguinho (footballer, born 1982), full name Rodrigo Castro Cesar Cabral, Brazilian football midfielder
Rodriguinho (footballer, born 1983), full name Rodrigo Batista da Cruz, Brazilian football striker
Rodriguinho (footballer, born 1984), full name Rodrigo Alves da Silva Santos, Brazilian football forward
Rodriguinho (footballer, born 1988), full name Rodrigo Eduardo Costa Marinho, Brazilian football attacking midfielder
Rodriguinho (footballer, born 2001), full name Rodrigo Araújo da Silva Filho, Brazilian football forward
Rodriguinho (footballer, born 2003), full name Rodrigo Henrique Santos de Souza, Brazilian football midfielder
Rodriguinho (footballer, born 2004), full name Rodrigo Huendra Almeida Mendonça, Brazilian football midfielder
Rodriguinho (volleyball) (born 1996), Brazilian volleyball player